The International Council for Science (ICSU, after its former name, International Council of Scientific Unions) was an international non-governmental organization devoted to international cooperation in the advancement of science. Its members were national scientific bodies and international scientific unions.

In July 2018, the ICSU merged with the International Social Science Council (ISSC) to form the International Science Council (ISC).

In 2017, the ICSU comprised 122 multi-disciplinary National Scientific Members, Associates and Observers representing 142 countries and 31 international, disciplinary Scientific Unions. ICSU also had 22 Scientific Associates. In July 2018, ICSU merged with the International Social Science Council (ISSC) to form the International Science Council (ISC) at a constituent general assembly in Paris.

Mission and principles
The ICSU's mission was to strengthen international science for the benefit of society. To do this, the ICSU mobilized the knowledge and resources of the international scientific community to:

 Identify and address major issues of importance to science and society.
 Facilitate interaction amongst scientists across all disciplines and from all countries.
 Promote the participation of all scientists – regardless of race, citizenship, language, political stance, or gender – in the international scientific endeavour.
 Provide independent, authoritative advice to stimulate constructive dialogue between the scientific community and governments, civil society, and the private sector."

Activities focused on three areas: International Research Collaboration, Science for Policy, and Universality of Science.

History
In July 2018, the ICSU became the International Science Council (ISC).

The ICSU itself was one of the oldest non-governmental organizations in the world, representing the evolution and expansion of two earlier bodies known as the International Association of Academies (IAA; 1899—1914) and the International Research Council (IRC; 1919—1931). In 1998, Members agreed that the Council’s current composition and activities would be better reflected by modifying the name from the International Council of Scientific Unions to the International Council for Science, while its rich history and strong identity would be well served by retaining the existing acronym, ICSU.

Universality of science

The Principle of Freedom and Responsibility in Science: the free and responsible practice of science is fundamental to scientific advancement and human and environmental well-being. Such practice, in all its aspects, requires freedom of movement, association, expression and communication for scientists, as well as equitable access to data, information, and other resources for research. It requires responsibility at all levels to carry out and communicate scientific work with integrity, respect, fairness, trustworthiness, and transparency, recognizing its benefits and possible harms. In advocating the free and responsible practice of science, the council promotes equitable opportunities for access to science and its benefits, and opposes discrimination based on such factors as ethnic origin, religion, citizenship, language, political or other opinion, sex, gender identity, sexual orientation, disability, or age.

The International Science Council's Committee on Freedom and Responsibility in Science (CFRS) "oversees this commitment and is the guardian of this work."

Structure
The ICSU Secretariat (20 staff in 2012) in Paris ensured the day-to-day planning and operations under the guidance of an elected executive board. Three Policy Committees − Committee on Scientific Planning and Review (CSPR), Committee on Freedom and Responsibility in the conduct of Science (CFRS) and Committee on Finance − assisted the executive board in its work and a General Assembly of all Members was convened every three years. ICSU has three Regional Offices − Africa, Asia and the Pacific as well as Latin America and the Caribbean.

Finances
The principal source of ICSU's finances was the contributions it receives from its members. Other sources of income are the framework contracts from UNESCO (United Nations Educational, Scientific and Cultural Organization) and grants and contracts from United Nations bodies, foundations and agencies, which are used to support the scientific activities of the ICSU Unions and interdisciplinary bodies.

Member organizations

Associate member organizations

See also
 Diversitas project, closed Dec 2014 transferred Jan 2015 to ICS as Future Earth
 InterAcademy Partnership

References

Bibliography 
 Greenaway, Frank (2006) Science International: A History of the International Council of Scientific Unions Cambridge University Press 
 Frängsmyr, Tore (1990) Solomon's house revisited: the organization and institutionalization of science. Science History Publications, U.S.A. 
 Crawford, Elisabeth (2002) Nationalism and Internationalism in Science, 1880-1939. Cambridge University Press

External links

ICSU at University of Waterloo Scholarly Societies directory
ICSU at United Nations

 
International organizations based in France
International scientific organizations
Organizations based in Paris
Scientific organizations based in France
Scientific organizations established in 1931
Science policy